Ken Buchanan MBE (born 28 June 1945) is a Scottish retired professional boxer from Edinburgh and the former undisputed world lightweight champion.

Boxing career

Early career
Before turning pro, Buchanan was the 1965 ABA featherweight champion. He started boxing professionally on 20 September 1965, beating Brian Tonks by a knockout in the second round in London. He spent much of the early parts of his career fighting undistinguished opponents in England. His Scottish debut came in his 17th fight, when he outpointed John McMillan over 10 rounds on 23 January 1967. Prior to that, he had also beaten Ivan Whiter by a decision in eight rounds.

Lightweight challenger
Buchanan extended his winning streak to 23 consecutive bouts before challenging Maurice Cullen on 19 February 1968 for the British lightweight title in London. He knocked Cullen out in the 11th round and became a world classified lightweight challenger.

He continued his way up the world lightweight rankings by defeating Leonard Tavarez, Angel Robinson Garcia and Whiter (in a rematch) among others, but on 29 January 1970, he found his first stone on the boxing road when he challenged future WBC junior welterweight champion Miguel Velasquez in Madrid, for the European lightweight title. Buchanan lost a 15-round decision to Velazquez, but nevertheless, he continued his ascent towards the number one spot in the rankings by beating Tavarez in a rematch, Chris Fernandez and Brian Hudson, the latter of whom was beaten by a knockout in five in a defence of the British lightweight title.

World champion
In September of that year, Buchanan travelled to Puerto Rico, where he would meet Ismael Laguna, the world lightweight champion from Panama, on 26 September 1970. Many experts believed San Juan's warm weather would affect Buchanan, but he upset those who thought that way and beat Laguna by a 15-round decision to become world's lightweight champion.

At that time, the WBA and the British Boxing Board of Control (BBBC), were in the middle of a feud, and Buchanan was not allowed to defend the WBA title fight in Great Britain. He finished 1970 beating Donato Paduano by a 10-round decision in a non-title bout on 7 December 1970.

Buchanan defeated Rubén Navarro in Los Angeles on 12 February 1971, defended the WBA championship, and acquired the vacant WBC championship.

And, he became the undisputed world lightweight champion.

After that, Buchanan was allowed to the world championship fight in Great Britain. Buchanan defeated former world junior welterweight champion Carlos Morocho Hernández by knockout in round eight, in Wembley on 11 May 1971.

Stripping of title
He was stripped of the WBC title for failing to defend against Pedro Carrasco on 25 June 1971.

Despite this setback, he remained the WBA world lightweight champion. Then, he flew to New York to meet Laguna again, this time defending his world title. Buchanan retained the title with another decision over Laguna on 13 September 1971.

His next fights were a couple of non-title affairs, one in London and one in South Africa. The South African fight against Andries Steyn in Johannesburg was a mismatch with his opponent's corner throwing in the towel in the third round on 29 April 1972.

His next defence came on 26 June 1972, against Panama's greatest, the then undefeated Roberto Durán at the Madison Square Garden (MSG) in New York, in a bout which had a highly controversial ending. Durán was ahead on all three cards at the end of the 13th round, when both fighters exchanged punches after the bell. Buchanan went down, writhing in pain from a low blow, that Buchanan's trainer, Gil Clancy, said was caused by a knee to the groin. Referee Johnny LoBianco awarded the fight to Durán, insisting that the blow that took down Buchanan was "in the abdomen, not any lower" and that he felt that Buchanan would be unable to continue fighting.

The New York Times columnist Red Smith wrote that LoBianco had to award the victory to Durán, even if the punch was a low blow, as "anything short of pulling a knife is regarded indulgently" in American boxing.

Durán's refusal to honour the contract to face Buchanan
In his next fight, Buchanan beat former three-time world champion Carlos Ortiz by a knockout in six, also at Madison Square Garden on 20 September 1972.

Buchanan finished 1972 with a win over Chang Kil Lee on 4 December 1972.

On 28 June 1972, Roberto Durán signed to defend it against Buchanan on 20 October 1972. However, Durán broke that agreement when the Panamanian Government insisted he make his first defence in Panama. He did, knocking out Jimmy Robertson on 20 January 1973.

Durán also had signed a second contract with the MSG on 25 October 1972, to defend against Buchanan on or before 30 June 1973.

Once again Durán broke the agreement, and subsequently had his licence suspended by the New York State Athletic Commission on 4 April 1973. The commission also warned Durán that his title recognition would be withdrawn.

The New York State Athletic Commission had been attempting for two years (1972–1974) to get Durán to honour an agreement to fight Buchanan. But Durán refused to honour the contract.

Later career
In 1973, Buchanan started out by beating future world lightweight champion Jim Watt by a decision after 15 rounds, to regain the British lightweight title. Soon, he embarked on another international tour that included more fights in the United States, several fights in Denmark, and one fight in Canada. He won each of those fights, leading towards a challenge of European lightweight champion Antonio Puddu in Italy, and Buchanan added the European lightweight championship belt to his shelf by defeating Puddu by a decision in 15 rounds.

He retained the title by beating Tavarez for the third time, this time by a knockout in 14 at Paris, and then he travelled to Japan to fight for the world title again. This time, however, he was defeated by a decision in 15 rounds by the WBC's world champion, Guts Ishimatsu.

Buchanan re-grouped once again, and won in a defence of the European lightweight title against Giancarlo Usai by a knockout in 12. But he retired from 1976 to 1978, leaving the European lightweight title vacant.

When he returned to professional boxing in 1978, he won two straight bouts, but everything else started going backwards for him. Challenging Charlie Nash in Copenhagen, he lost by a decision in twelve. In 1980, he won two bouts in a row, but after that, he lost five bouts in a row, finally retiring for good after losing to George Feeney by a decision in eight on 25 January 1982. In 2000, he was elected to the International Boxing Hall of Fame. In 2002 he was inducted into the Scottish Sport Hall of Fame.

Professional boxing record

See also
Lineal championship
List of world lightweight boxing champions
List of British world boxing champions

References

External links

Ken Buchanan – A Look Back At a True Great - The Story of Buchanans Rise To Fame, ringnews24.com; accessed 20 August 2017.
Ken Buchanan interview, stv.tv, 18 June 2007; accessed 20 August 2017.

|-

|-

1945 births
Living people
Scottish male boxers
Boxers from Edinburgh
International Boxing Hall of Fame inductees
Lightweight boxers
World lightweight boxing champions
World Boxing Association champions
World Boxing Council champions
The Ring (magazine) champions
Lists of British boxing champions
European Boxing Union champions
Members of the Order of the British Empire
People educated at Portobello High School